Eric Lodal (born January 30, 1976) is an American screenwriter, creator, producer and director.  He has written and developed original television series and feature films for F/X, TNT, Fox Studios, Sonar, Sony and New Regency.   He is noted for co-creating Murder in the First from 2014 to 2016. 

Lodal has also developed TV series with William Broyles Jr. (Laredo), Stephen Gaghan (Search and Rescue), Michael Eisner (Bel Canto), and Michael De Luca (Simple City), amongst others.  Lodal is currently working on several projects including a dramatic rendering of the Kennedy presidency, which he has developed with novelist Scott Lasser (Battle Creek, True Detective) and producing partners Tim White of Star Thrower Entertainment and Perrin Chiles.

Lodal spent his twenties engaged in a number of diverse professional pursuits, ranging from classical music to politics and investment banking. A classically trained opera singer, he has performed as a soloist at Carnegie Hall, with the New York City Opera, and was featured on NPR's "World of Opera".   He served as Communications Director for former Governor of Virginia and current US Senator Tim Kaine.   A native of Virginia, he received his B.A. from Yale University with a double major in economics and music, and a master's degree from The Juilliard School.

References

1976 births
Living people
American male screenwriters
American television producers
American television directors
People from Virginia